Patrick Cham (born 18 May 1959 in Saint-Claude, Guadeloupe) is a French former professional basketball player.

Professional career
Cham was the French 2nd Division French Player's MVP in 1992, while playing with Levallois Sporting Club.

National team career
Cham had 113 caps with the senior French national basketball team, from 1981 to 1989.

References 

1959 births
Living people
1986 FIBA World Championship players
Basketball players at the 1984 Summer Olympics
French men's basketball players
French people of Guadeloupean descent
Olympic basketball players of France
Stade Français basketball players